T.C. Steele Boyhood Home, also known as the T.C. Steele House, is a historic home located at Waveland, Montgomery County, Indiana. It was built about 1852, and is a -story, three bay, Greek Revival style frame dwelling with a front-gable roof.  The house was renovated and enlarged between 1895 and 1902.  It was partially  restored in 2002.  Restoration was completed in 2014 and the home now operates as a privately owned, no cost retreat for artists and historic preservationists.  It was the boyhood home of noted Indiana impressionist artist T.C. Steele (1847-1926).

It was listed on the National Register of Historic Places in 2003. Current programming for the location includes plein air paint outs, annual family reunions, artist mentoring weekends, school field trips, and public tours by appointment.

References

Houses on the National Register of Historic Places in Indiana
Houses completed in 1852
Greek Revival houses in Indiana
Houses in Montgomery County, Indiana
National Register of Historic Places in Montgomery County, Indiana
1852 establishments in Indiana